Wolfenstein II: The New Colossus is a 2017 action-adventure first-person shooter video game developed by MachineGames and published by Bethesda Softworks. It was released on 27 October 2017 for PlayStation 4, Windows, and Xbox One, and was released on 29 June 2018 for Nintendo Switch. The eighth main entry in the Wolfenstein series and the sequel to 2014's Wolfenstein: The New Order, the game is set in an alternate history which takes place in 1961 following the Nazi victory in the Second World War. The story follows war veteran William "B.J." Blazkowicz and his efforts to fight against the Nazi regime in the United States.

The game is played from a first-person perspective and most of its levels are navigated on foot. The story is arranged in chapters, which players complete in order to progress. A binary choice in the prologue alters the game's entire storyline; some characters and small plot points are replaced throughout the timelines. The game features a variety of weapons, most of which can be dual wielded. A cover system is also present. Continuing from The New Order, the development team aimed to characterize Blazkowicz for players to adopt his personality. Mick Gordon returned as the game's composer, and is joined by Martin Stig Andersen.

Wolfenstein II: The New Colossus was released to a positive critical response. Particular praise was directed at the characters, narrative, shooting mechanics, as well as the general presentation of the game. The game was nominated for multiple year-end awards, including nominations at the 35th Annual Golden Joystick Awards and The Game Awards 2017, the latter in which it received the accolade for "Best Action Game". Following the game's launch, MachineGames released Freedom Chronicles, which is a collection of three downloadable content packs.

Gameplay 

Wolfenstein II: The New Colossus is an action-adventure shooter game played from a first-person perspective. To progress through the story, players battle enemies throughout levels. The game utilizes a health system in which players' health is divided into separate sections that regenerate; if an entire section is lost, players must use a health pack to replenish the missing health. Players use melee attacks, firearms, and explosives to fight enemies, and may run, jump, crawl, and occasionally swim to navigate through the locations. Melee attacks can be used to silently take down enemies without being detected. Alternatively, players can engage in direct combat, which often results in an intense firefight between the two parties. Enemy commanders can call for reinforcements several times.

A cover system can be used in combat as assistance against enemies. Players have the ability to lean around, over, and under cover, which can be used as a tactical advantage during shootouts and stealth levels. Stilts are also available during some game segments for a further tactical advantage. The game gives players a wide variety of weapon options; they can be found on the ground, retrieved from dead enemies, or removed from their stationary position and carried around. Weapon ammunition must be manually retrieved from the ground or from dead enemies. Players have access to a weapon inventory, which allows them to carry as many weapons as they find. Players have the ability to freely mix weapons for dual wielding, giving them an advantage over enemies by dealing twice as much damage. Players can also customize weapons through the use of upgrades. Scopes and suppressors can also be attached to weapons.

Plot 
During the final events of Wolfenstein: The New Order, the Kreisau Circle retrieves a critically injured William "B.J." Blazkowicz (Brian Bloom) from Deathshead's fortress before destroying it with a nuclear cannon. Blazkowicz falls into a five-month-long coma. As he fades in and out of consciousness aboard the captured U-boat Eva's Hammer, it is revealed that Anya, Blazkowicz's love interest, is pregnant with twins. The U-boat is attacked by SS-Obergruppenführer Irene Engel, a sadistic Nazi commander who captures Caroline and Fergus or Wyatt (depending on who the player let Deathshead kill in a flashback). Blazkowicz devises a plan to get himself captured and taken to Engel's airship, the Ausmerzer, which is suspending the U-boat above water. Engel tries to have her daughter Sigrun decapitate Caroline, but the former refuses, resulting in Engel killing Caroline herself. Irene then tries to kill the other captive, Sigrun prevents it by tackling Engel, allowing Blazkowicz to use Caroline's armor. Blazkowicz disconnects Eva's Hammer from the Ausmerzer and flees back to the U-boat with Sigrun and Caroline's body.

After Caroline's funeral, the group decides to carry out what would have been the next step in her plan to end the Nazi regime: liberate America and use it as a central base from which to free the rest of the world. The group sets out to contact a resistance group hiding in the Empire State Building amid the ruins of Manhattan, which was destroyed by a Nazi atomic bomb. Blazkowicz finds and recruits Grace Walker (Debra Wilson), a passionate, scarred African-American, and Norman "Super Spesh" Caldwell, a lawyer-turned-conspiracy theorist, parents to a baby girl named Abby. Grace informs the Circle of her plan to kill the top Nazi leaders by destroying the Oberkommando, in Roswell, New Mexico near the site of an unearthed Da'at Yichud cache. Blazkowicz travels to Roswell with a portable nuclear warhead, before heading to Super Spesh's hideout. Spesh takes him to his bunker and to a tunnel that leads to the Oberkommando, where Blazkowicz deposits the bomb in the base's reactor and detonates it.

After escaping Roswell, he takes a detour to Mesquite, his hometown, to recover an heirloom ring. Blazkowicz's extremely abusive and racist father Rip (Glenn Morshower) appears and chastises him, justifying his abuse of Blazkowicz and his mother, and allowing her to be taken by the Nazis because she was Jewish, and that he intends to hand him over to the Nazis. Blazkowicz kills his father as Engel's forces arrive and he is captured once more while Engel keeps the ring for herself. Super Spesh later visits Blazkowicz under the guise of his lawyer, telling him of their plan to break him out. However, Engel kills Spesh, having known his ruse.

After hallucinating a reunion with his mother, Blazkowicz is sentenced to death and beheaded at the Lincoln Memorial, Washington D.C. in front of millions in a televised event. However, the Kreisau Circle recovers his head and Set surgically grafts it onto a bioengineered Nazi super-soldier body. Blazkowicz breaks into a Nazi bunker hidden under New York, stealing a file on New Orleans, which is revealed to be a large ghetto. Blazkowicz travels there to gather several freedom fighters under the command of communist Horton Boone. They break out of the ghetto and escape on Eva's Hammer. The Kreisau Circle considers capturing the Ausmerzer to prevent its use against the group's planned revolution, but realize that it would be nearly impossible due to an automated defense system called ODIN. The group plans to steal the codes to deactivate ODIN by traveling to Venus, where the codes are kept in a Nazi facility. Blazkowicz assumes the identity of an actor and is invited to Venus to participate in a propaganda film audition produced by Adolf Hitler (Norbert Weisser), who is looking for a suitable actor to play Blazkowicz. Blazkowicz retrieves the ODIN codes and returns to Earth to decipher them, and the Kreisau Circle throw him a birthday party upon arrival. The Kreisau Circle mounts an assault on the Ausmerzer, where the resistance members disable ODIN and hijack its command systems. Blazkowicz and his team travel back to the ground, where Engel is on national television in California. Blazkowicz kills Engel and the Kreisau Circle proclaims the start of a revolution to liberate America.

In a post-credits scene, Blazkowicz takes back his heirloom ring from Engel's body and proposes to Anya. The revolution is depicted pictorially during the credits sequence.

Development 

The narrative theme of The New Colossus is "catharsis". Creative director Jens Matthies was intrigued by the juxtaposition of America, which was "founded on the idea of freedom", to be under totalitarian control. The development team also enjoyed exploring iconic American locations and events of the 1960s, such as diners and parades. The team attempted to make the enemies larger and more intimidating for players. The game features over 100 actors, whose performances were recorded using performance capture technology; about 40 hours of performances were recorded. The development team wanted to delve further into the character of protagonist William "B.J." Blazkowicz, for players to feel as though they are him. In the game's opening, Blazkowicz uses a wheelchair; the team was enthusiastic to include combat during these scenes, as a "testament to B.J.'s willpower". The game was developed using id Tech 6; the technology and animations required a complete overhaul from The New Order, which used id Tech 5. The team also built a full body model of Blazkowicz, which can be seen from the first-person perspective.

The developers stated that they did not intend the game to be a commentary on contemporary politics, other than a few jokes. However, commentators drew parallels between the game's premise and contemporary accounts of the rise of alt-right in the United States, particularly after the events of the August 2017 Unite the Right rally in Charlottesville, Virginia and the murder of counter-protestor Heather Heyer. Bethesda's marketing head Pete Hines stated that the game was "not written to be a commentary on current events, because no one – at MachineGames or at Bethesda – could predict what would happen". Hines further stated that they otherwise made no changes to the game, nor plan to change downloadable content for the game, based on these events.

Mick Gordon, who previously scored the 2016 reboot of Doom, returned to score Wolfenstein II along with newcomer Martin Stig Andersen, who previously scored the puzzle-platform game Inside, along with special music contributions by Fredrik Thordendal, Pedro Macedo Camacho, who previously worked on Star Citizen, and Christoffer Larsson. The official soundtrack was released digitally on 19 June 2018. Like the other game, the music is primarily industrial, with distorted synthesizers and reverbed electric guitars, with some rock influence.

Release
While the game itself was not intended to reference current events, Bethesda, supported by MachineGames, opted to use current attitudes towards Nazis from these events in its marketing of the title. Bethesda's Marketing VP Pete Hines stated: "We weren't going to hide from the fact our game is about killing Nazis and freeing the US from their rule, and if we can reference current events as part of talking about the game, so be it. Nazis are evil. We aren't afraid to remind people of that". The game adopted the phrase "Make America Nazi-Free Again", based on Donald Trump's slogan "Make America Great Again", as its primary advertising tagline. Other ads used the phrase "Not My America", a slogan used by groups protesting Trump's policies. The marketing campaign drew positive attention, but was criticized by members of the alt-right, as well as Trump supporters who said the advertisements unfairly associated them with Nazis. Responding to the negative feedback, Hines said, "we don't feel it's a reach for us to say Nazis are bad and un-American, and we're not worried about being on the right side of history here". He also said "people who are against freeing the world from the hate and murder of a Nazi regime probably aren't interested in playing Wolfenstein." Wolfenstein II: The New Colossus was originally teased at Bethesda's press conference during E3 2016. The game was officially announced at the E3 2017 conference in June 2017. The game was released on 27 October 2017 for PlayStation 4, Windows, and Xbox One. A 2018 release for Nintendo Switch was announced during the September 2017 Nintendo Direct presentation. The Nintendo Switch version was released on 29 June 2018. The game's collector's edition includes a Blazkowicz action figure, a steelbook, and a poster.

For the German release of The New Colossus, all Nazi symbols and references were removed; it is a criminal offence to display Nazi imagery on toys in Germany. The German software ratings board, Unterhaltungssoftware Selbstkontrolle, later introduced the "social adequacy clause", which allowed the use of such imagery in relevant scenarios, reviewed on a case-by-case basis. Bethesda made the uncensored international version (which lacks German as a language option) available for purchase in Germany on 22 November 2019, while continuing to sell the censored and localised version separately.

Downloadable content
Three downloadable content packs, collectively titled Freedom Chronicles, were released by MachineGames and Escalation Studios. Each pack introduces a new protagonist who join the resistance to fight against the Nazi regime in America. Bethesda added that the three DLC packs, alongside the prologue Episode 0, will offer 9 hours of new content to players. The three DLC packs generally received mixed reviews from critics, with critics criticising their story, recycled environment, and map design.

Reception

Pre-release
The game's announcement was met with praise from game journalists. Kat Bailey of USGamer named it the "best game of E3", while Nerdist's Dan Casey and PC Gamers Evan Lahti listed it among their favorites. Oli Welsh of Eurogamer wrote that the game is "a bracing piece of trailer theatre with real character and daring". At IGN's Best of E3 2017 Awards, the game was awarded Best Shooter; it was also nominated for Game of Show and Best Trailer.

Post-release 
Wolfenstein II: The New Colossus was released to "generally favorable" reviews, according to review aggregator Metacritic. Chris Moyse's 8/10 score on Destructoid stated that "Impressive effort with a few noticeable problems holding it back. Won't astound everyone, but is worth your time and cash." Michael Goroff's score of 8/10 on EGMNow said that "Wolfenstein II: The New Colossus story and imaginative level design carry the burden of its quality on their shoulders, but they're backed up by solid shooter mechanics and really cool guns. While the experience as a whole might be inconsistent and sometimes frustrating, it's an experience worth having. After all, you get to blow up a bunch of Nazis. Also, did we mention the guns were really cool?" Jason Faulkner from Game Revolution gave the game a score of 4 out of 5 stars saying that "Wolfenstein II: The New Colossus wraps up the feeling of a blockbuster movie in something you can interact with. There's a lot of games that do that, but the spectacle here is outstanding, and the fast-paced gunplay and compelling main story made me want more when the credits rolled. Killing Nazis is one of the most fun and wholesome things a person can do, and there's no better way than to do it with Wolfenstein II." Andy Hartup of GamesRadar+ awarded it 4.5 out of 5 stars stating that "Wolfenstein II offers slick shooting, plenty of spectacle, and heaps of fun characters to interact with. The plot is far from perfect, and levels are a touch dull, but overall it's a must-play." 9.1/10 was Dan Stapleton's score on IGN with the consensus: "The excellent shooting action in Wolfenstein II: The New Colossus is paired with a fantastically written and acted story." Samuel Roberts's 81/100 score on PC Gamer stated that "The New Colossus is a fun and frantic FPS, even if it doesn't feel quite as fresh as The New Order did." "Wolfenstein II: The New Colossus jumps from breakneck bloodshed, to humour involving your endearing crew, with aplomb; a masterfully done sequel," was Colm Ahern's conclusion on VideoGamer.com with a score of 9/10.

Entertainment Weekly placed Wolfenstein II at #10 on the list of the "Best Games of 2017", Polygon also placed it at #10 on their list of the 50 best games of 2017, and GamesRadar+ ranked it eighth on their list of the 25 Best Games of 2017, while Eurogamer ranked the game 20th on their list of the "Top 50 Games of 2017". EGMNow also ranked the game at #5 in their list of the 25 Best Games of 2017.

Sales 
The game debuted in 4th place in the UK and Australian Sales charts, 5th in the New Zealand Sales charts and 14th in the U.S. sales charts.

Awards

Sequel 
On 10 June 2018, Bethesda Softworks announced Wolfenstein: Youngblood, a co-op spin-off serving as a continuation of the series that was released on 26 July 2019, with the story taking place twenty years after the events of The New Colossus. A direct sequel to The New Colossus is planned by Bethesda Softworks and MachineGames.

Notes

References

External links
 
 

2017 video games
Action-adventure games
Advertising and marketing controversies
Bethesda Softworks games
Cultural depictions of Adolf Hitler
Dystopian video games
Experimental medical treatments in fiction
First-person shooters
Id Tech games
Ku Klux Klan in popular culture
MachineGames games
Video games about Nazis
Nazism in fiction
Nintendo Switch games
Patricide in fiction
PlayStation 4 games
Retrofuturistic video games
Single-player video games
Terrorism in fiction
Video games set on Venus
Video game sequels
Video games about Nazi Germany
Video games developed in Sweden
Video games scored by Mick Gordon
Video games set in 1961
Video games set in Alaska
Video games set in California
Video games set in Chicago
Video games set in Kansas
Video games set in Los Angeles
Video games set in New Mexico
Video games set in New Orleans
Video games set in New York City
Video games set in Texas
Video games set on the Moon
Video games set in Washington, D.C.
Video games with downloadable content
Video games using Havok
Windows games
Wolfenstein
Video games about World War II alternate histories
Xbox One games
The Game Awards winners